In Greek mythology, the name Meda (Ancient Greek: Μήδα) may refer to:

Meda, wife of King Idomeneus. While her husband fought at Troy, she had a love affair with Leucus (like Clytaemnestra and Aegiale, she became unfaithful to her husband at the instigation of Nauplius). However, Leucus eventually killed Meda and her daughter Cleisithyra, and seized the power over the kingdom of Idomeneus.
Meda, daughter of Phylas and mother of Antiochus by Heracles.
Meda, another name for Iphthime.

Notes

References 

 Apollodorus, The Library with an English Translation by Sir James George Frazer, F.B.A., F.R.S. in 2 Volumes, Cambridge, MA, Harvard University Press; London, William Heinemann Ltd. 1921. ISBN 0-674-99135-4. Online version at the Perseus Digital Library. Greek text available from the same website.
 Pausanias, Description of Greece with an English Translation by W.H.S. Jones, Litt.D., and H.A. Ormerod, M.A., in 4 Volumes. Cambridge, MA, Harvard University Press; London, William Heinemann Ltd. 1918. . Online version at the Perseus Digital Library
 Pausanias, Graeciae Descriptio. 3 vols. Leipzig, Teubner. 1903.  Greek text available at the Perseus Digital Library.

Women of Heracles
Women in Greek mythology
Cretan characters in Greek mythology